Durbe (Durbe/Дурбен Durben) is a town in Latvia. Durbe was first noted in 1260, when the Battle of Durbe occurred near Lake Durbe. As of 2020, the population was 492.

Town rights were granted to Durbe in 1893 and confirmed in 1917. Durbe manor served as the headquarters of a German brigade in 1917.

Town coat of arms was granted in 1925 - a silver apple tree. In Latvian folklore an apple tree is considered a magical source of youth and sympathy.

Notable people
Zigfrīds Anna Meierovics (1887 - 1925), Prime Minister of Latvia and Minister of Foreign Affairs of Latvia.

See also
List of cities in Latvia

References

External links 

 Durbe town  in Latvian

 
Towns in Latvia
Populated places established in 1893
Castles of the Teutonic Knights
South Kurzeme Municipality
Grobin County
Courland